Rina Dewi Puspitasari (born 5 October 1985 in East Jawa) is an athlete from Indonesia. She competes in archery.

Puspitasari represented Indonesia at the 2004 Summer Olympics. She placed 46th in the women's individual ranking round with a 72-arrow score of 616. In the first round of elimination, she faced 19th-ranked Jennifer Nichols of the United States. Puspitasari lost 160–141 in the 18-arrow match, placing 46th overall in women's individual archery.

At the 2008 Summer Olympics in Beijing Puspitasari finished her ranking round with a total of 620 points. This gave her the 42nd seed for the final competition bracket in which she faced Miroslava Dagbaeva in the first round. Both archers scored a total of 106 points in the regular match and a decisive extra round had to make the difference. In this extra round Dagbaeva scored 10 points while Puspitasari only scored 9 points and was eliminated.

Notes and references

External links
  at beijing2008
 Profile at sports-reference.com

1985 births
Living people
People from Bojonegoro Regency
Sportspeople from East Java
Indonesian female archers
Olympic archers of Indonesia
Archers at the 2004 Summer Olympics
Archers at the 2008 Summer Olympics
Archers at the 2006 Asian Games
Archers at the 2010 Asian Games
Southeast Asian Games gold medalists for Indonesia
Southeast Asian Games silver medalists for Indonesia
Southeast Asian Games medalists in archery
Competitors at the 2005 Southeast Asian Games
Asian Games competitors for Indonesia
20th-century Indonesian women
21st-century Indonesian women